Steven Andrew "Steve" Short (born April 6, 1954) is a retired American professional ice hockey player. He played 6 games in the National Hockey League with the Los Angeles Kings and Detroit Red Wings during the 1977–78 and 1978–79 seasons. The rest of his career, which lasted from 1974 to 1981, was spent in the minor leagues.

Career statistics

Regular season and playoffs

International

External links
 
 Steve Short's profile at Hockey Draft Central

1954 births
Living people
Adirondack Red Wings players
American men's ice hockey left wingers
Detroit Red Wings players
Fort Worth Texans players
Ice hockey players from Minnesota
Kalamazoo Wings (1974–2000) players
Kansas City Red Wings players
Los Angeles Kings players
NCAA men's ice hockey national champions
People from Roseville, Minnesota
Philadelphia Firebirds (NAHL) players
Philadelphia Flyers draft picks
Phoenix Roadrunners draft picks
Richmond Robins players
Springfield Indians players
Wisconsin Badgers men's ice hockey players